Kathleen Newman-Bremang is a Canadian writer and broadcaster, most noted as a journalist and editor for Refinery29 and as a guest commentator on the CBC Radio One arts and culture magazine show Q.

She has also worked as a television producer for The Social, eTalk and the MuchMusic Video Awards.

In 2021 she appeared on CBC Music's inaugural Canada Listens debates, advocating for Kardinal Offishall's album Quest for Fire: Firestarter, Vol. 1. The album won the competition.

In 2022 she received a Canadian Screen Award nomination for Best Host in a Web Program or Series at the 10th Canadian Screen Awards, as cohost with Lainey Lui of the livestreamed Toronto Film Critics Association Awards 2020 presentation. She was also named as one of three winners, alongside Amanda Parris and Kayla Grey, of the Academy of Canadian Cinema and Television's inaugural Changemaker Award.

References

21st-century Canadian women writers
21st-century Canadian journalists
Canadian radio personalities
Canadian television producers
Canadian women journalists
Canadian magazine journalists
Canadian magazine editors
Black Canadian broadcasters
Black Canadian women
Black Canadian writers
Canadian Screen Award winners
Living people
Canadian women television producers
Year of birth missing (living people)